The Flux Advanced Security Kernel (FLASK) is an operating system security architecture that provides flexible support for security policies. It is a joint venture between the National Security Agency, the University of Utah, and the Secure Computing Corporation project designed to provide a framework for a more secure operating system. Development and implementation started with the Mach microkernel, and has since shifted its focus to the Linux operating system. FLASK is a core framework in security-focused operating systems such as NSA's Security-Enhanced Linux (SELinux), OpenSolaris FMAC and TrustedBSD. This means that SELinux can be thought of as an implementation of FLASK.

References

External links
Univ of Utah FLASK site
SELinux from the NSA
TrustedBSD
OpenSolaris Project: Flexible Mandatory Access Control
Flask: Flux Advanced Security Kernel
GFAC: A similar Framework concept implemented in RSBAC

Operating system security
Linux security software